Robert François du Buysson (Born 6 May 1861 - Broût-Vernet (Allier) - Deceased 16 March 1946 - Saint-Rémy-la-Varenne (Maine-et-Loire)), was a French naturalist.

Biography
He is the son of botanist :fr:François-Charles du Buysson (1825-1906) and Mathilde de Montaignac (1829-1899) and the brother of entomologist :fr:Henri du Buysson.

Having developed a taste for herbariums at a very young age and a keen sense of observation, Robert du Buysson began to study the mosses of his native region rapidly expanding his field of study to lichens and vascular cryptogams. From 1888 to 1893 he published an inventory of vascular cryptogams of Europe in the Scientific Review of Bourbonnais and the Centre of France. In the field of bryology, the name of Robert du Buysson remains attached to two species: Orthorichum berthoumieui, named in honor of Father Berthoumieu with whom he studied the mosses around Saint-Pourçain (Allier), and Barbula buyssoni.

Robert du Buysson distinguished himself especially in the study of insects 
In April 1898 he obtained a position as a temporary entomology preparer at the Zoology Laboratory of the National Museum of Natural History in Paris. In 1900, he was appointed titular preparer for insects and crustaceans. Most of his work has been published in the Annales de la Société entomologique de France

Robert du Buysson bequeathed his collection of hymenoptera to the entomology laboratory of the National Museum of Natural History.

Family

Du Buysson Married Claire d'Espinay on February 8, 1899, and had one daughter Marie-Cécile du Buysson (1899-1997)

His two siblings were Henri du Buysson, Marquis du Buysson (1856-1927) and Isabelle du Buysson b.1858.

Publications

 List may be incomplete.

1903 
 du Buysson, R., 1903: Note pour servir à l'histoire des Strepsiptères. Bull. Soc. Ent. France 1903" 174-175.

1905 
 du Buysson, R., 1905: Monographie des guêpes ou Vespa. Ann. Soc. Ent. France 72: 260–288.
 du Buysson, R., 1905: Monographie des guêpes ou Vespa (Parts 2 and 3). Ann. Soc. Ent. France 73: 485–556, 565-634, 11 pl.
 du Buysson, R., 1905: Monographie des Vespides du genre Nectarina. Ann. Soc. Ent. France 74: 537–566, 6 pl.
 du Buysson, R., 1905: Descriptions d'Hymenopteres nouveaux. Bulletin de la Société entomologique de France. 1905: 281–282.

1907 
 du Buysson, R., 1907: Nouvelles especes d'Ischnogaster (Hymenopteres) appartenant au Musee de. Notes from the Leyden Musum 29: 79–80.

1908 
 du Buysson, R., 1908: Deux Hyménoptères nouveaux de Java. Notes from the Leyden Museum 30: 123–126

1909 
 du Buysson, R., 1909: Monographie des Vespides du genre Belonogaster. Ann. Soc. Ent. France 78: 199–270, 6 pl.. Ann Soc Entomol Fr 72: 260–288.
 du Buysson, R., 1909: Hyménoptères nouveaux ou peu connus. Annali del Museo di Storia Naturale di Genova, ser 3 4 (= 44): 312–315.
 du Buysson, R., 1909: Deux Hyménoptères nouveaux d'Oceanie. Bulletin de la Société entomologique de France 1909: 305–306.

1913 
 du Buysson, R., 1913 (1911): Hymenoptera der Aru- und Kei-Inseln, Vespi-dae et Eumenidae. Abhandlungen der Senckenbergischen Naturfor-schenden Gesellschaft 34: 227–230.
 du Buysson, R., 1913: Sur deux Vespides de Java. Bulletin du Musée royal d'Histoire naturelle, Paris 7: 436–437.
 du Buysson, R., 1913: Sur quelques Vespides (Hym.). Bulletin de la Société entomologique de France 1913: 296–301.

Notes
 Lamy (D.), « Robert du Buysson (1861-1946) et la bryologie dans l'Allier entre 1870 et 1895 », in Cryptogamie. Bryologie, lichénologie, INIST-CNRS, 1984, .

Sources
Biographical information is based on a translation from an equivalent article at the French French Wikipedia.

Taxa named by Robert du Buysson
1861 births
1946 deaths
French entomologists